Cinder Mountain is a partly eroded cinder cone at the head of Snippaker Creek, British Columbia, Canada. An isolated pile of subaerial basalt flows and associated pillow lava rest on varved clay and till in King Creek. Cinder Mountain last erupted during the Pleistocene.

See also
List of volcanoes in Canada
List of Northern Cordilleran volcanoes
Northern Cordilleran Volcanic Province
The Volcano
Volcanism of Canada
Volcanism of Western Canada

References

Boundary Ranges
Cinder cones of British Columbia
Stikine Country

Monogenetic volcanoes
Pleistocene volcanoes